Quileute Canyon (also Quillayute Canyon) is a submarine canyon, off of Washington state, United States.

Its location

It is just north of Quinault Canyon.

Quileute Canyon is offshore, from both La Push and Forks. Quillayute River pours into the Pacific Ocean, onshore, near Rialto Beach, and Quillayute Needles National Wildlife Refuge is also near, onshore. The Quileute Indian Reservation is near, onshore.

Exploration

As of September 2017, the area is being explored.

Aquatic life

Large sponges and large jellyfish have been found, living there.

Nearby submarine canyons

All of the following submarine canyons are near, headed north to south:

 Clayoquot Canyon
 Father Charles Canyon
 Loudon Canyon
 Barkely Canyon
 Nitinat Canyon
 Juan de Fuca Canyon
 Quileute Canyon
 Quinault Canyon
 Grays Canyon
 Guide Canyon
 Willapa Canyon
 Astoria Canyon

See also

Local geography

 Abyssal fan
 Astoria Canyon
 Astoria Fan
 Cascadia Basin
 Cascadia Channel
 Cascadia Subduction Zone
 Grays Canyon
 Juan de Fuca Canyon
 Juan de Fuca Plate
 Juan de Fuca Channel
 Nitinat Canyon
 Nitinat Fan
 Quileute Canyon
 Willapa Canyon

Other uses of the term Quileute

 Quileute
 Quileute language
 Quillayute River
 Quileute Tribal School
 USS Quileute (YTB-540)

Other uses of the term Quillayute

 Quillayute Airport
 Quillayute Needles National Wildlife Refuge
 Quillayute Valley School District

References

External links and references

 A page with a map
 More information

Geography of the Pacific Northwest
Submarine canyons of the Pacific Ocean